José de Alcíbar, or Alzíbar (1725/30 - 1803, Mexico City) was a Mexican painter, of Basque origin; active from 1751 to 1801.

Biography
He may have been a student of José de Ibarra and is known to have worked in the studios of Miguel Cabrera.

He was one of the founding members of the Real Academia de Bellas Artes de San Carlos in 1784, where he served as a professor and participated in activities there until his death. Most of his works were on religious themes, paintings for churches, or portraits of notable people. He was known to be active in all the cultural affairs of the city. 

Among his religious works are the five altarpieces in the Chapel of San Nicolás Tolentino, at the Hospital Real de Indios, which were completed in 1781. Five years later, he painted two canvases for pennons of the Galician Brothers, who had an altar in the chapel in the Convent of San Francisco en México.

Gallery

See also
Mexican art

References

Further reading
Robin, Alena: "La Pasión de Cristo según José de Alcíbar (Museo de Arte Sacro, Chihuahua, México)", Via Spiritus, Revista de História da Espiritualidade e do Sentimento Religioso, 17, 2010, pgs. 197-228.

External links

Alcíbar @ the Museo del Prado

18th-century births
1803 deaths
Year of birth uncertain
Mexican painters

18th-century Mexican painters
18th-century male artists
Mexican male painters
Mexican portrait painters
Religious artists
Religious painters